Vladimir Podrezov (born 27 January 1994) is a Russian rugby union player for London Irish in Premiership Rugby. He generally plays as a prop and represented Russia internationally.

He was included in the Russian squad for the 2019 Rugby World Cup which is scheduled to be held in Japan for the first time and also marks his first World Cup appearance.

Career 
He made his international debut for Russia against Namibia on 11 July 2015.

In April 2021, it was confirmed that he had signed a short-term contract with Premiership Rugby side London Irish for the remainder of the 2020–21 season.

References 

Russian rugby union players
Russia international rugby union players
Living people
1994 births
Sportspeople from Kaliningrad
Rugby union props